Abstract may refer to:
 Abstract (album), 1962 album by Joe Harriott
 Abstract of title, a summary of the documents affecting title to parcel of land
 Abstract (law), a summary of a legal document
 Abstract (summary), in academic publishing
 Abstract art, artistic works that do not attempt to represent reality or concrete subjects
 Abstract: The Art of Design, 2017 Netflix documentary series
 Abstract music, music that is non-representational
 Abstract object in philosophy
 Abstract structure in mathematics
 Abstract type in computer science
 The property of an abstraction
 Q-Tip (musician), also known as "The Abstract"
 Abstract and concrete

See also
 Abstraction (disambiguation)